The frogmouths are a group of nocturnal birds related to owlet-nightjars, swifts, and hummingbirds. Species in the group are distributed in the Indomalayan and Australasian realms.

Biology
They are named for their large flattened hooked bill and huge frog-like gape, which they use to capture insects. The three Podargus species are large frogmouths restricted to Australia and New Guinea, that have massive flat broad bills. They are known to take larger prey such as small vertebrates (frogs, mice, etc.), which are sometimes beaten against a stone before swallowing. The ten Batrachostomus frogmouths are found in tropical Asia. They have smaller, more rounded bills and are predominantly insectivorous. Both Podargus and Batrachostomus have bristles around the base of the bill, and Batrachostomus has other, longer bristles which may exist to protect the eyes from insect prey. In April 2007, a new species of frogmouth  was described from the Solomon Islands and placed in a newly established genus, Rigidipenna.

Their flight is weak. They rest horizontally on branches during the day, camouflaged by their cryptic plumage. Through convergent evolution as night hunters, they resemble owls, with large front-facing eyes.

Up to three white eggs are laid in the fork of a branch, and are incubated by the female at night and the male in the day.

Taxonomy
DNA-DNA hybridisation studies had suggested that the two frogmouth groups may not be as closely related as previously thought, and that the Asian species may be separable as a new family, the Batrachostomidae. Although frogmouths were formerly included in the order Caprimulgiformes, a 2019 study estimated the divergence between Podargus and Batrachostomus to between 30 and 50 mya and forming a clade well separated from the nightjars and being a sister group of the swifts, hummingbirds, and owlet-nightjars. The name Podargiformes proposed in 1918 by Gregory Mathews was reinstated for the clade.

Species

 Genus Podargus
 Tawny frogmouth, Podargus strigoides
 Marbled frogmouth, Podargus ocellatus
 Papuan frogmouth, Podargus papuensis

 Genus Batrachostomus
 Large frogmouth, Batrachostomus auritus
 Dulit frogmouth, Batrachostomus harterti
 Philippine frogmouth, Batrachostomus septimus
 Gould's frogmouth, Batrachostomus stellatus
 Sri Lanka frogmouth, Batrachostomus moniliger
 Hodgson's frogmouth, Batrachostomus hodgsoni
 Sumatran frogmouth, Batrachostomus poliolophus
 Javan frogmouth, Batrachostomus javensis
 Blyth's frogmouth, Batrachostomus affinis
 Sunda frogmouth, Batrachostomus cornutus
 Palawan frogmouth, Batrachostomus chaseni
 Bornean frogmouth, Batrachostomus mixtus

 Genus Rigidipenna
 Solomons frogmouth, Rigidipenna inexpectata

In culture 
In a journal article published in April 2021, researchers Katja Thömmes and Gregor Hayn-Leichsenring from the Experimental Aesthetics group at the University Hospital Jena, Germany, found the frogmouth to be the most "instagrammable" bird species. Using an algorithm to analyze the aesthetic appeal of more than 27,000 bird photographs on Instagram, they found that photos depicting frogmouths received the highest number of likes relative to the posts' exposure to users. The journal article was picked up by several news outlets, including The New York Times and The Guardian.

References

External links

Frogmouth videos on the Internet Bird Collection
Video: Finding the Sri-Lanka Frogmouth, Southern India
Scientists discover new genus of frogmouth bird in Solomon Islands